Dreamtone & Iris Mavraki's Neverland is a music group, a collaboration between Turkish progressive metal band Dreamtone and Greek singer Iris Mavraki. Commonly abbreviated as "Neverland", their music can be best described as Symphonic power metal.

History
In 2004, Neverland's former manager Orpheus Spiliotopoulos listened to Dreamtone's first demo, Unforeseen Reflections and later introduced the band and Iris Mavraki to each other. Throughout the writing and composing stages of the songs, Iris was in Greece and Dreamtone were in Turkey. During this time, they recorded a collection of demos (two of which are on the special edition of the band's first CD). In December 2007, Neverland signed their first record contract with AFM Records and set out to record their debut album, Reversing Time.

Teaming up with the guest artists Hansi Kürsch, Tom Englund, Gary Wehrkamp and Mike Baker, they recorded the band's first 12 tracks. The album was released in February 2008 after visiting 8 studios before finalized. Also during Hansi Kürsch's recording sessions, the recordings had to be rescheduled six times and cancelled once due to various reasons, from touring to storms destroying studio rooftops. Mike Baker, the recently deceased singer, reserved the track Reversing Time when he first heard it, without a second thought. This track was his final officially released singer appearance and ironically the song is about a person trying to reverse the time and stop his death.

Future
As of February 1, 2009, Dreamtone & Iris Mavraki's Neverland are recording their second album which is to be released through AFM Records.

Band members

Current members
 Oganalp Canatan - Vocals
 Iris Mavraki - Vocals
 Onur Ozkoc - Guitars
 Burak Kahraman - Guitars
 Emrecan Sevdin - Drums
 Can Dedekarginoglu - Bass
 Guney Ozsan - Keyboard

Guest Artists

Discography

Studio albums
 Reversing Time (2008)
 Ophidia (2010)

Compilations
 Power and Glory - The Best Power Metal Hymns Vol. 1 (2008)

See also 
 Blind Guardian
 Evergrey
 Shadow Gallery

References

External links
 Dreamtone & Iris Mavraki's Neverland Homepage
 Dreamtone Homepage
 Dreamtone & Iris Mavraki's Neverland at MySpace
 Iris Mavraki at MySpace

Turkish heavy metal musical groups
Power metal musical groups
Symphonic metal musical groups
Musical groups established in 2005